Muhammad Javed Afridi (Urdu, ; born 14 August 1985) is a Pakistani business executive and entrepreneur.

Business Interests 
He is best known as the CEO of Haier Pakistan and owner of MG Motors Pakistan. Afridi is also owner of the cricket franchise Peshawar Zalmi in Pakistan Super League (PSL) and also Co-Founder/CEO of JoChaho.

MG JW Automobile Pakistan 
MG JW Automobile Pakistan is owned by JW Auto Park, which in turn owned by Javed Afridi. MG Motors Pakistan has signed Memorandum of Understanding (MoU) with Morris Garages (MG) Motor UK Limited, owned by SAIC Motor to bring electric vehicles in Pakistan. It will establish Electric car manufacturing plant. MG Motors has launched two models namely MG HS and MG ZS EV in Pakistan in 2020. Morris Garage (MG) Motors Pakistan launched MG ZS priced at Rs 4.1 million.

Investment in cricket 
Javed Afridi has sponsored many cricket tournaments under his supervision including Haier Super 8 T20 Cup and Pakistan Super League. Afridi has also owned a cricket franchise Peshawar Zalmi for a ten-year period. In an interview he said: “Peshawar and KP are close to my heart, and I want to develop the infrastructure around the game in my homeland.”

See also
MG Motors Pakistan
Haier Pakistan
Super 8 T20 Cup
Pakistan Super League
Peshawar Zalmi

References

External links 

 

Pakistani chief executives
Pashtun people
Pakistan Super League franchise owners
1985 births
Edwardes College alumni
Alumni of the London School of Economics
Alumni of Saïd Business School
People from Khyber District
Living people
Peshawar Zalmi
Javed
Pakistanis named in the Pandora Papers